The Best of Skyhooks is the second compilation album released in December 1979 by Australian band Skyhooks, following The Skyhooks Tapes in 1977. The album was released after lead singer Graeme Strachan left in late 1978. The album peaked at number 9 in Australia.

Background 

Australian pop rock group Skyhooks had formed in March 1973. By 1978 they had issued four studio albums, Living in the 70's (October 1974), Ego Is Not a Dirty Word (July 1975), Straight in a Gay Gay World (August 1976) and Guilty Until Proven Insane (March 1978), from which the tracks for their second compilation album, The Best of Skyhooks (December 1979) were gathered. For the first three studio albums the line-up was Greg Macainsh on bass guitar, Graeme "Shirley" Strachan on lead vocals, Bob "Bongo Starr" Starkie on guitar, Imants "Freddie" Strauks on drums and Red Symons on guitar. They had all been produced by Ross Wilson. After Straight in a Gay Gay World Symons was replaced on guitar by Bob Spencer and following Guilty Until Proven Insane Strachan left. For the latter album they had worked with Eddie Leonetti in the studio. The Best of Skyhooks peaked at No. 9 on the Australian Kent Music Report albums chart.

Reception

Track listing

Charts

References

Skyhooks (band) albums
Compilation albums by Australian artists
1979 greatest hits albums
Mushroom Records albums